is a professional Japanese baseball player. He plays outfielder for the Chiba Lotte Marines.

References 

2000 births
Living people
Baseball people from Osaka Prefecture
Japanese baseball players
Nippon Professional Baseball outfielders
Chiba Lotte Marines players
People from Toyonaka, Osaka